The Derryfield School is an independent college preparatory, coeducational high school and middle school located in Manchester, New Hampshire, United States. It is a day school serving grades 6–12.

History

In the early 1960s, a group of 39 Manchester families came together to establish a new school, focused on educating the "whole child" like a boarding school; however, it would be a day school, allowing for family involvement in students' daily lives. The school was incorporated in July 1964, and in the fall of 1965, The Derryfield School opened its doors, with 108 students in grades 7–10, and 11 faculty members. The first headmaster was one of the founders, Elenore Freedman. Grades 11 and 12 were added in the two successive years as the original tenth grade students advanced; the first commencement was held in 1968. Grade 6 was added in 1999.

While naturally focusing on academics, the founders also wanted students to be well-rounded, civic-minded individuals, able to make a positive difference in their community. So, from the school's beginnings, additional emphasis was placed on the arts, athletics, and community service.

The school spent its first year and a half in the Boys Club in downtown Manchester. In February 1967, the first buildings of its new campus were completed on River Road, north of downtown, and the school relocated there.

Since then, the school has grown to almost 400 students in seven grades and a faculty and staff of more than 80. The campus has continued to expand to meet the requirements of the growing student body and education in the 21st century. The focus on educating the whole child has not changed, however. Alongside the academic program, athletics, the arts, and community service continue to be the foundation of a Derryfield education.

Campus

The original  parcel of land on which the school buildings sit was bought from the Morrison family in 1965. Construction of the first campus buildings began immediately, and the school moved into its new facilities in February 1967.

As the student body grew, numerous campaigns were launched to expand the school's facilities. The first, in 1973, financed the construction of the Center for Student Activities – the current gymnasium which, at the time, also served as an auditorium. In 1981, a connector from the academic building to the gym was built, to house the school's library, administrative offices, and a student forum. A performing arts theater was completed in 1988, and a new middle school building was added in 1999. The Gateway Building, completed in 2010, contains the admission, development, college counseling and business offices, as well as the offices of Breakthrough Manchester. A new Science and Innovation Center was completed in 2019 and contains wet and dry labs, a makerspace, robotics lab, inspiration lounge, and an audio/video production studio.

The grounds were expanded in 1996, when the school acquired  of land, adjacent to its original parcel, from New Hampshire College (now Southern New Hampshire University). The school used this additional acreage to build six new athletic fields and a cross-country running course, allowing for the continued expansion of its athletic offerings.

The Turf Field, Derryfield's premier artificial surface athletic field, was built in 2008, with floodlights added in 2009. Drainage and special snow blowing equipment make it ready to use in or after almost any weather situation. Derryfield's soccer, field hockey and lacrosse teams use it regularly, and the baseball and softball teams use it for practice when their grass fields are unplayable. The field is also used by outside clubs and teams, either for regular rental, or in the early spring, when their own grass fields may be still frozen or under water.

The construction of a new athletic and wellness center was completed in November 2019. The new building is located on top of the land where the tennis courts used to be, across from the building with the old gym.

Beginning in 2022, construction of a new dining hall has begun. The dining hall will be built into the athletic & wellness center, and fill the space between the center and the main school building.

Athletics

Derryfield offers a comprehensive interscholastic athletic and physical activity program on several levels, competing in numerous sports in both the Middle and Upper Schools during all three seasons. The Middle School teams compete in the Tri-County League, with teams from New Hampshire's Merrimack, Hillsborough and Rockingham counties. The Upper School is a New Hampshire Interscholastic Athletic Association Division IV member school, although some sports such as lacrosse and field hockey compete in higher divisions, due to the team's record of success. There are also opportunities to participate in non-team and independent sports in both the Middle and Upper Schools.

Every student in grades 7–12 is required to participate in two seasons of physical activity each year. Missing a practice or a game is considered as serious as missing a class. Failure to complete the physical activity requirement will jeopardize graduation.

Sports offerings

Middle school 

 Soccer (boys & girls)
 Field hockey (girls)
 Cross-country and Track (boys & girls)
 Alpine and Nordic skiing (boys & girls)
 Basketball (boys & girls)
 Strength training (boys & girls)
 Baseball (boys)
 Lacrosse (boys & girls)
 Tennis (boys & girls)

Upper school 

(championships prior to 2000 not listed)

 Soccer (boys & girls) boys: state champs 2001, 2002, 2009, 2012–2015; girls: state champs 2000, 2001, 2005, 2008–2010, 2014, 2015
 Field hockey (girls) D-II, state champs 2007, 2010–2013, 2018
 Cross country (boys & girls)
 Golf (co-ed) D-III, state champs 1999, 2002–2005, 2012–2013, 
 Crew (boys & girls)
 Basketball (boys & girls)
 Alpine and Nordic skiing (boys & girls) boys' alpine: state champs 2010, 2014, 2016
 Strength training (boys & girls)
 Swimming (co-ed)
 Hockey (co-ed) D-II first season 2014–2015
 Baseball (boys) state champs 2003
 Softball (girls) [currently not offered]
 Tennis (boys & girls) boys: D-II, state champs 2003–2009, 2014; girls: D-III, state champs 2000, 2006, 2008–2010
 Lacrosse (boys & girls) boys: D-II, state champs 2010, 2013, 2016, 2017, 2018, 2019; girls: D-III, state champs 2014
 Track & field (co-ed)
 Equestrian (co-ed)
 Yoga (co-ed)

In both middle and high school, students have the option to participate in what is called an Independent Sport. This means that to fulfill one of two yearly sports requirements, students may count a sport or activity they participate in outside of school. They must log the same amount of hours per week as a Derryfield sport, and it must be signed off by a supervisor. Only one independent sport is allowed per academic year.

Notable alumni

Gary Hirshberg (born 1954) Class of 1972, President of Stonyfield Farm yogurts
John D. Robinson (born 1968) Class of 1986, disability advocate, CEO of Our Ability, Inc.
Sarah Silverman (born 1970) Class of 1989, comedian, actress
Forbes Smiley (born 1956) convicted map thief
David B. Snow Jr. (born 1954) Class of 1972, former CEO of Medco Health Solutions

External links

Official website
Breakthrough Manchester

References

Schools in Manchester, New Hampshire
Educational institutions established in 1964
Preparatory schools in New Hampshire
Private high schools in New Hampshire
1964 establishments in New Hampshire